This is a list of fatal commercial aviation accidents and incidents in or in the vicinity of the United States or its territories.

It comprises a subset of both the list of accidents and incidents involving airliners in the United States and the list of accidents and incidents involving commercial aircraft.

It does not include fatalities due to accidents and incidents solely involving private aircraft or military aircraft.

All incidents involving commercial aircraft in the United States are investigated by the National Transportation Safety Board.


List

See also
List of aircraft accidents and incidents resulting in at least 50 fatalities

External links
 Department of Transportation, Special Collections - archived accident reports of the Civil Aeronautics Board
 Recent aviation accidents investigated by the NTSB (National Transportation Safety Board)
 Older aviation accidents investigated by the NTSB
 Aviation studies conducted by the NTSB
 Aviation statistical Reports, by the NTSB
 Aircraft Crash Record Office
 The Aviation Herald
 Aviation Safety Network
 Jet Airliner Crash Data Evaluation Centre
 PlaneCrashInfo.com
 

 
 
Airliners in the United States
Accidents and incidents in the United States
Accidents, Airliners
Aviation